Acacia merinthophora, also known as zig-zag wattle, is a tree or shrub belonging to the genus Acacia and the subgenus Juliflorae that is endemic to western Australia.

Description
It has pendulous, flexuose and ribbed branchlets that are sericeous between the ribs. Like most species of Acacia it has phyllodes rather than true leaves . The sessile phyllodes are strongly incurved with a quadrangular cross-section. It flowers from May to September producing yellow flowers. The simple inflorescences are found singly or in groups of two or three in the axils. The seeds inside the pods are arranged longitudinally.

Taxonomy
The species was first formally described by the botanist Ernst Georg Pritzel in 1904 as part of the work by Pritzel and Ludwig Diels, Fragmenta Phytographiae Australiae occidentalis. Beitrage zur Kenntnis der Pflanzen Westaustraliens, ihrer Verbreitung und ihrer Lebensverhaltnisse as published in the journal Botanische Jahrbucher fur Systematik, Pflanzengeschichte und Pflanzengeographie. It was reclassified as Racosperma merinthophorum by Leslie Pedley in 2003 then transferred back into genus Acacia in 2006.
The specific epithet is derived from the Greek language from the words merinthos meaning cord or string and phoreo meaning carry or wear in reference to the long thin shape of the phyllodes.

Distribution
It is native to Wheatbelt, Great Southern and Goldfields-Esperance regions of Western Australia from around Koorda in the north to Coolgardie in the east and Narrogin in the west where it is found in low-lying areas, on hillsides and sandplains growing in rocky sandy soils often around granite outcrops where it is a part of shrubland communities.

See also
List of Acacia species

References

merinthophora
Acacias of Western Australia
Taxa named by Ernst Pritzel
Plants described in 1904